represented Japan in wrestling at the 1984 Olympics in Los Angeles, and won the gold medal in the bantamweight division.

He later coached the 2004 Athens Olympics wrestling team. He is currently the head coach of the Nihon University wrestling team.

References

External links
 
 http://www.accessmylibrary.com/coms2/summary_0286-12822770_ITM
 
 

1957 births
Living people
Japanese male sport wrestlers
Olympic wrestlers of Japan
Olympic gold medalists for Japan
Olympic medalists in wrestling
Wrestlers at the 1984 Summer Olympics
Medalists at the 1984 Summer Olympics
Asian Games medalists in wrestling
Asian Games gold medalists for Japan
Wrestlers at the 1978 Asian Games
Wrestlers at the 1982 Asian Games
Medalists at the 1978 Asian Games
Medalists at the 1982 Asian Games
Universiade medalists in wrestling
Universiade silver medalists for Japan
Nihon University people
World Wrestling Championships medalists
Medalists at the 1981 Summer Universiade
20th-century Japanese people
World Wrestling Champions
Presidents of the Japan Wrestling Federation